Porto Bello was the hunting lodge of the last Royal Governor of the British Colony of Virginia, John Murray, 4th Earl of Dunmore. The name commemorates the battle of Porto Bello, a 1739 British naval victory in Panama. Lord Dunmore fled to Porto Bello to escape the early stages of the American Revolution in Williamsburg, Virginia.  He later boarded a British ship lying at anchor near Porto Bello in the York River.

Porto Bello is located in York County, Virginia on the grounds of Camp Peary.  It is listed on the National Register of Historic Places, but is closed to visitors because of restricted access to Camp Peary.

Notes

References

External links

Houses in York County, Virginia
Virginia in the American Revolution
Houses on the National Register of Historic Places in Virginia
National Register of Historic Places in York County, Virginia
Historic American Buildings Survey in Virginia
1773 establishments in Virginia